Chantal Maillard (born 1951) is a contemporary Spanish poet and philosopher.

With a long repertoire behind her, she has received various literary prizes for her poetry. She was awarded the Premio Nacional de Poesía in Spain in 2004 for her work Matar a Platón and the Premio de la Crítica for Spanish Poetry in 2007, as well as the Premio Andalucía de la Crítica for her work Hilos. Her prose is particularly characterized for merging and transgressing literary genres. Her essays mainly concern philosophy and sometimes focus on María Zambrano.

After receiving her doctorate in Philosophy from the University of Málaga, she spent long periods traveling and living in India, specializing in Philosophy and Religions from India at the Banaras Hindu University. Until 2000, she was a professor of Aesthetics and Art Theory at the University of Málaga, where was instrumental in the creation of the Department of Comparative Philosophy and Aesthetics.

Since 1998, she has written articles on philosophy, aesthetics and Eastern Thought for several publications such as ABC and El País. She has translated and edited the work of Henri Michaux, and is also known for her efforts to promote philosophy from India in many of her works.

Chantal Maillard has also worked on stage and adapted her works to various interdisciplinary projects, in collaboration with visual and stage artists, musicians and filmmakers from Spain and around the world.

Works

Poetry
Semillas para un cuerpo (in collaboration with Jesús Aguado). Soria: Diputación Provincial de Soria, 1988. Premio Leonor 1987
La otra orilla. Coria del Río: Qüásyeditorial, 1990. Premio Juan Sierra 1990
Hainuwele. Córdoba: Ayuntamiento de Córdoba, 1990. Premio Ciudad de Córdoba «Ricardo Molina» 1990
Poemas a mi muerte. Madrid: La Palma, 1993. Premio Ciudad de Santa Cruz de la Palma 1993
Conjuros. Madrid: Huerga y Fierro. Editores, S.L., 2001.
Lógica borrosa. Málaga: Miguel Gómez Ediciones, 2002.
Matar a Platón. Barcelona: Tusquets, 2004. Premio Nacional de Poesía 2004
Hilos, 2007. Premio Nacional de la Crítica 2007 and Premio Andalucía de la Crítica 2008.
La tierra prometida. Barcelona: Milrazones, 2009.
Hainuwele y otros poemas. Barcelona: Tusquets, 2009.
Cual. DVD. Contains a reading of "Hilos" and a short film interpreted by the author. Málaga: Centro de la Generación del 27, 2009.
Polvo de avispas. Málaga: Árbol de Poe, (booklet) 2011.
Balbuceos. Málaga: Árbol de Poe, (booklet) 2012.
La herida en la lengua. Barcelona, 2015

Prose
Filosofía en los días críticos. Valencia: Editorial Pre-Textos, 2001.
Diarios indios. Valencia: Editorial Pre-Textos, 2005.
Husos. Notas al margen. Valencia: Editorial Pre-Textos, 2006.
Adiós a la India. Málaga: Puerta del Mar, 2009.
Bélgica. Valencia: Editorial Pre-Textos, 2011.
India. Valencia: Editorial Pre-Textos, 2014.
La baba del caracol. Spain-Mexico: Editorial Vaso Roto, 2014.

Essays
La kábala del kéter-malkut. Editoriales Andaluzas Unidas, 1986
El monte Lu en lluvia y niebla. María Zambrano y lo divino. Málaga: Diputación Provincial de Málaga, 1990.
La creación por la metáfora. Introducción a la razón poética. Barcelona: Anthropos, 1992.
El crimen perfecto. Aproximación a la estética india. Madrid: Tecnos, 1993.
La sabiduría como estética. China: confucianismo, budismo y taoísmo. Madrid: Akal, 1995.
La razón estética. Barcelona: Laertes, 1998.
Rasa. El placer estético en la tradición india. Benarés: Indica Books, 1999 and Palma de Mallorca: Olañeta, 2007.
En la traza. Pequeña zoología poemática. Barcelona: Centro de Cultura Contemporánea 2008.
Contra el arte y otras imposturas. Valencia: Editorial Pre-Textos, 2009.

Editions
Estética y Hermenéutica. Chantal Maillard and Luis de Santiago Guervós (eds.). Málaga: Contrastes. Revista Interdisciplinar de Filosofía, 1999.
Henri Michaux: Escritos sobre pintura. Murcia: Colegio de Arquitectos y Aparejadores, 2000.
El árbol de la vida. La naturaleza en el arte y las tradiciones de la India. Barcelona: Kairós, 2001.
Henri Michaux: Retrato de los meidosems. Valencia: Editorial Pre-Textos, 2008.

Available translated works
Killing Plato. English translation of Matar a Platón by Yvette Siegert. New York: New Directions, 2019. Shortlist, PEN Award for Poetry in Translation.
Draden gevold door Wat. Dutch translation of Hilos seguido de Cual by Bart Vonck. Leuven (Belgium): Editorial P, 2014. 
Amazzare Platone. Italian translation of Matar a Platón by Gabriele Blundo. Rome: Edizioni Elliot, 2013.
In the Tracing. Small Poetic Zoology. Centro de Cultura Contemporánea de Barcelona, 2008. (Lecture given at the Center of Contemporary Culture of Barcelona on 11 February 2008, as part of the Barcelona Debate Series, "The Human Condition"). 
Platon töten. German translation of Matar a Platón by Elisabeth Seifer.  Zürich: Teamart Publishers, 2006. 
Plato doden: Dutch translation of Matar a Platón by Bart Vonck. Leuven: Editorial P, 2006.
 
Available in Braille through the ONCE: 
Matar a Platón.
Hilos.
Hainuwele y otros poemas.

Theatre
Matar a Platón en Concierto. With Chefa Alonso and Barbara Meyer. Madrid: Teatro Español, 2011 y Palma de Mallorca: Museo Es Baluart, 2013.
Diarios Indios. With David Varela. Madrid: Teatro Pradillo, 2014.

Prizes
Premio Leonor 1987
Ciudad de Córdoba «Ricardo Molina» 1990
Premio Juan Sierra 1990
Ciudad de Santa Cruz de la Palma 1993
Premio Nacional de Poesía 2004
Premio Nacional de la Crítica 2007
Premio Andalucía de la Crítica 2008

External links
 Official author's web: chantalmaillard.com

.
Interview 
Interview El País
«Jaisalmer» (Fragments) 
 (Interview)
 TV3 Program: La hora del lector, 14 May 2010.
 Información

1951 births
Living people
Writers from Brussels
Spanish philosophers
Spanish people of Belgian descent
20th-century Spanish poets
Spanish women poets
21st-century Spanish poets
21st-century Spanish women writers
20th-century Spanish women writers
Spanish women philosophers